Phasianotrochus eximius, common name the kelp shell or true kelp, is a species of sea snail, a marine gastropod mollusk in the family Trochidae, the top snails.

This species was given many names over the course of time, but the accepted name was introduced by Iredale, T. &  McMichael, D.F. in 1962.

Description
The height of the shell varies between 20 mm and 40 mm. The imperforate, solid, rather thick shell has an elongated-conical shape. It is polished and shining. The color of the shell is brown, fawn-color or rosy, with widely spaced light or dark narrow spiral lines, usually four in number on the penultimate whorl. The surface is microscopically spirally densely striate. The slender spire is straight-sided. The apex is acute. The 7 whorls are a little convex.  The body whorl is rounded at the periphery. The ovate aperture slightly exceeds one-third the total length. It is brilliantly iridescent within, and sulcate. The greenish peristome is thickened. The vertical columella is toothed below the middle.

Distribution
This marine species is endemic to Australia and occurs in the subtidal and in the intertidal zone on seaweed off New South Wales, South Australia, Victoria, Tasmania and Western Australia.

List of synonyms

 Bulimus eximius Perry, 1811 (original description)
 Bulimus carinatus Perry, 1811
 Cantharidus badius Pilsbry, H.A. 1889
 Cantharidus eximius Pilsbry, H.A. 1901
 Cantharidus leucostigma Pilsbry, H.A. 1889
 Cantharidus peronii Pilsbry, H.A. 1889
 Elenchus badius Angas, G.F. 1865
 Elenchus leucostigma (Menke in Philippi, 1843)
 Elenchus lineatus Angas, G.F. 1865
 Elenchus ocellatus Gould, 1862
 Elenchus splendidulus Swainson, 1840
 Monodonta rosea Lamarck, 1822
 Monodonta lineata Lamarck, 1822
 Trochus australis Quoy & Gaimard, 1834
 Trochus badius Wood, 1828
 Trochus fulimineus Kiener, 1850
 Trochus gracilis Philippi, 1851
 Trochus leucostigma Philippi, 1845
 Trochus lineatus Fischer, P. 1876
 Trochus lividus Kiener, 1850
 Trochus nitidus Kiener, 1850
 Trochus peronii Philippi, 1846
 Trochus quoyi Philippi, 1846
 Trochus roseus Philippi, R.A. 1850
 Trochus vermiculosus Kiener, 1850

References

 Lamarck, J.B. 1822. Histoire naturelle des Animaux sans Vertèbres. Paris : J.B. Lamarck Vol. 7 711 pp
 Swainson, W.S. 1840. A Treatise on Malacology or the natural classification of shells and shellfish. London : Longman, Brown, Green & Longmans 419 pp.
 Philippi, R.A. 1845. Abbildungen und Beschriebungen neuer oder wenig gekannter Conchylien. Cassel : Theodor Fischer Vol. 2 64 pp.
 Kiener, L.C. 1850. Spécies général et Iconographie des coquilles vivantes, comprenant la collection du Muséum d'histoire Naturelle de Paris, la collection de Lamarck, celle du Prince Massena (appartenant maintenant a M. le Baron B. Delessert) et les découvertes récentes des voyageurs. Paris : Ballière pls 1-27, 29-43, 45, 46, 50-52, 55, 56.
 Philippi, R.A. 1851. Trochidae. pp. 137–232 in Küster, H.C. (ed). Systematisches Conchylien-Cabinet von Martini und Chemnitz. Nürnberg : Bauer & Raspe Vol. II.
 Perry, G. 1811. Conchology, or the natural history of shells containing a new arrangement of the genera and species, illustrated by coloured engravings, executed from the natural specimens and including the latest discoveries. London : W. Miller 4 pp., 62 pls.
 Wood, W. 1828. Index Testaceologicus; or A Catalogue of Shells, British and Foreign, arranged according to the Linnean system. London : Taylor Supplement, 1-59, pls 1-8. 
 Gould, A.A. 1862. Otia Conchologica, descriptions of shells and mollusks from 1839 to 1862. Boston : Gould & Lincoln pp. I–IV 1–256
 Angas, G.F. 1865. On the marine molluscan fauna of the Province of South Australia, with a list of all the species known up to the present time, together with remarks on their habitats and distribution, etc. Proceedings of the Zoological Society of London 1865: 155-"180"
 Angas, G.F. 1867. List of species of marine Mollusca found in Port Jackson Harbour, New South Wales, and on the adjacent coasts, with notes on their habits, etc. Part 1. Proceedings of the Zoological Society of London 1867: 185-233 
 Fischer, P. 1876. Genres Calcar, Trochus, Xenophora, Tectarius et Risella. pp. 97-114 in Keiner, L.C. (ed.). Spécies general et iconographie des coquilles vivantes. Paris : J.B. Baillière Vol. 11. 
 Troschel, F.H. 1879. Das Gebiss der Schnecken, zur Begründung einer Natürlichen Classification [by J. Thiele, written after Troschel's death]. Berlin : Nicolaische Verlagsbuchhandlung Vol. II 237 pp
 Pilsbry, H.A. 1901. Notes on two species of Cantharidus. Nautilus 15(1): 8 [8]
 Hedley, C. 1908. Studies on Australian Mollusca. Part 10. Proceedings of the Linnean Society of New South Wales 33: 456-489
 Iredale, T. 1931. Australian molluscan notes. No. 1. Records of the Australian Museum 18(4): 201-235, pls xxii-xxv
 Cotton, B.C. 1959. South Australian Mollusca. Archaeogastropoda. Handbook of the Flora and Fauna of South Australia. Adelaide : South Australian Government Printer 449 pp
 Hickman, C.S. & McLean, J.H. 1990. Systematic revision and suprageneric classification of trochacean gastropods. Natural History Museum of Los Angeles County. Science Series 35: i-vi, 1-169
 Wilson, B. 1993. Australian Marine Shells. Prosobranch Gastropods. Kallaroo, Western Australia : Odyssey Publishing Vol. 1 408 pp
 Hickman C.S. (2005) Seagrass fauna of the temperate southern coast of Australia I: The cantharidine trochid gastropods. In: F.E. Wells, D.I. Walker & G.A. Kendrick (eds), The marine flora and fauna of Esperance, Western Australia: 199-220. Western Australian Museum, Perth.
 Grove, S. 2011. The Seashells of Tasmania: A Comprehensive Guide. Taroona, Australia: Taroona Publications. [vi], 81

External links
 Perry, G. 1811. Conchology, or the natural history of shells containing a new arrangement of the genera and species, illustrated by coloured engravings, executed from the natural specimens and including the latest discoveries. London : W. Miller 4 pp., 62 pls
 Quoy, J.R. & Gaimard, J.P. 1834. Voyage de Découvertes de l'Astrolabe exécuté par Ordre du Roi, Pendant les Années 1826-1829. Paris : J. Tastu Zoologie Vol. 3 366 pp
 Philippi, R. A. (1846-1855). Die Kreiselschnecken oder Trochoideen (Gattungen Turbo, Trochus, Solarium, Rotella, Delphinula, Phasianella). In Abbildungen nach der Natur mit Beschreibungen. In: Küster, H. C.; Ed. Systematisches Conchylien Cabinet von Martini und Chemnitz. Zweiten Bandes, dritte Abtheilung. 2(3): 1-372, pl. 1-49. Nürnberg: Bauer & Raspe
 Gould, A. A. (1861). Description of new shells collected by the United States North Pacific Exploring Expedition. Proceedings of the Boston Society of Natural History. 7
 To Biodiversity Heritage Library (4 publications)
 To World Register of Marine Species
 

eximius
Gastropods of Australia
Gastropods described in 1811